Edward Coleman Huff Jr. (December 7, 1902 – January 8, 1936) was an American Negro league catcher and manager in the 1920s.

A native of Georgia, Huff attended Wilberforce University. He made his Negro leagues debut in 1922 with the Indianapolis ABCs, and played for the Bacharach Giants the following season. Huff served as player-manager of the Dayton Marcos in 1926. He died in an accident in Dayton on January 8, 1936.

References

External links
 and Seamheads
  and Seamheads

Bacharach Giants players
Dayton Marcos players
Indianapolis ABCs players
Negro league baseball managers
1902 births
1936 deaths
20th-century African-American sportspeople
Baseball catchers
Accidental deaths in Ohio